Calacuccia is a commune in the Haute-Corse department of France on the island of Corsica.
It contains the Lac de Calacuccia, a hydroelectric reservoir, just south of the village of Calacuccia.

Geography

Climate
Calacuccia has a warm-summer mediterranean climate (Köppen climate classification Csb).

Population

See also
Communes of the Haute-Corse department

References

Communes of Haute-Corse
Haute-Corse communes articles needing translation from French Wikipedia